László Szobothin de Muray-Szombath  (lived in the 18th century) was Slovene petty nobleman in Hungary. Lived in Murska Sobota. In 1750, wrote his only work in Latin language: Divus Ivo oratione panegyrica celebratus, dum in academica soc. Jesu D. Joannis Baptista basilica incl. facultas juridica coram senatu populoque academico annuos honores eidem divo tutelari suo solenni ritu instauraret... a. salutis 1750. m. Junio, die 7. Tyrnaviae. 1750. The book published in Trnava.

See also 
 List of Slovene writers and poets in Hungary
 Hungarian Slovenes

External links 
 Szinnyei József: Magyar írók élete és munkái – Szobothin László (de Muray-Szombath)

Slovenian writers and poets in Hungary
18th-century births
18th-century deaths
People from Murska Sobota